is a railway station  in the city of Kaminoyama, Yamagata Prefecture, Japan, operated by East Japan Railway Company (JR East).

Lines
Uzen-Nakayama Station is served by the Ōu Main Line, and is located 68.3 rail kilometers from the terminus of the line at Fukushima Station.

Station layout
The station has two opposed side platforms connected via a footbridge. The station is unattended.

Platforms

History
Uzen-Nakayama Station opened on 15 November 1952. The station was absorbed into the JR East network upon the privatization of JNR on 1 April 1987. It was renamed to its present name on 1 July 1992. A new station building was completed in 2001.

Surrounding area

External links

 JR East Station information 

Stations of East Japan Railway Company
Railway stations in Yamagata Prefecture
Ōu Main Line
Railway stations in Japan opened in 1952
Kaminoyama, Yamagata